Lappeenrannan NMKY (also known as LrNMKY for short or as Team Lappeenranta in European competitions) is a basketball club based in a city of Lappeenranta, Finland. It was formed in 1951 as a Young Men's Christian Association (NMKY in Finnish) and has won two Finnish Championships (2005, 2006) and two Finnish Cups (2005, 2006). 

Team Lappeenranta participated in Fiba EuroCup challenge in 2005/2006 finishing in semi-finals. In 2007/2008 season team is willing to make another run in Europe, this time in FIBA EuroCup. After the 2013–14 season, NMKY left the Korisliiga because of financial problems.

Honours
Korisliiga
Winners (2): 2005, 2006
Finnish Cup
Winners (4): 2005, 2006, 2007, 2008

Season by season

References

External links
 Lappeenrannan NMKY - Official site (Finnish)
 Finnish Basketball Association / Korisliiga (Finnish)
 Eurobasket - team page

Basketball teams in Finland
Lappeenranta
Sports clubs founded by the YMCA
Basketball teams established in 1951
1951 establishments in Finland